Baby Blues is an American adult animated sitcom, based on the comic strip of the same name by Rick Kirkman and Jerry Scott, produced by Warner Bros. The first eight episodes of Baby Blues originally aired in the United States on The WB between July 28 and August 24, 2000, before being canceled. The five remaining episodes from the first season eventually aired on Adult Swim in 2002. A second season, consisting of 13 episodes, was produced but never aired.

The animated adaptation of Baby Blues differs from the comic by having it take place when Zoe was still an infant, even though she was the older sister to Hammie in the strip at the time. In addition, it focuses on Darryl and Wanda's relationship with supporting characters created for this series, including the Bittermans, a dysfunctional next-door family with three children; Bizzy, Zoe's babysitter; and Kenny, Darryl's laid-back close friend and co-worker.

Characters

Main

 Darryl MacPherson (Mike O'Malley) is the uptight and responsible father of Zoe and husband to Wanda. He tends to think Wanda's heart-felt ideas are crazy, but will later agree with them if there is an advantage for himself.  He wants the best for his baby daughter, but can overly protect her.  Despite intending to do the right thing, he has done unexpected selfish things, such as pretending to grieve over going with Carl and their kids to a fun zone, only to watch an attractive dancer at the place singing every time it was a child's birthday. But in the end, he is faithful to his wife and daughter. Darryl often feels that his wife nags him and will always discuss his issues to his friend, Kenny at work. Most commonly, he will talk about a problem, the next day, talk about how happy he is to have solved the problem an easy way, then the next day, talk about how it did not work out.  Darryl is quick to express jealousy—particularly of Carl, his next door neighbor.
 Wanda MacPherson (Julia Sweeney) is Darryl's wife and Zoe's mother. She is caring, unpredictable, passionate and impulsive by turns. However, just as Darryl does, she loves Zoe and wants only the best for her. Wanda is a stay at home mom. Her closest friends are her neighbor Melinda and a teenage girl named Bizzy, who serves as Zoe's babysitter from time to time. Wanda generally has a cheerful disposition, but she is quick to let her emotions get the best of her. She will usually go through drastic measures to fix something, against her husband's wishes. Wanda is occasionally melancholy about motherhood, as suggested by the title Baby Blues. She is said to have a "crazy spark" in her that never left. This is seen at one point, when she wants to feel young again and escapes with Bizzy and her friends at night and gets caught by the police. Wanda's unpredictable and impulsive behavior is often a source of extreme stress for Darryl. However, in the end, they always settle their differences and make peace after the arguments and problems are resolved.
 Zoe MacPherson (E. G. Daily) is the infant daughter of Darryl and Wanda. As a baby, Zoe's curiosity and emotions are expressed in her eyes, which show almost complete understanding when something happens or if somebody talks to her. Although calm and cheerful in the day time, she is very loud and cries nonstop at night, leaving her parents to stay up all night, taking turns rocking her, and carrying her until day time. Zoe appears to have a really close relationship with Rodney, the trouble kid next door who seems to be the only one who could stop her crying and comfort her.
 Melinda Bitterman (Arabella Field) is Wanda's friend and neighbor whose family is dysfunctional. Melinda is always seen smoking in her yard as her husband and kids are working on some bizarre, dangerous or disastrous activity. Any time she sees Wanda, she always greets with the same line, "Hi Wanda, how's the baby?" Seemingly careless or tired, Melinda seems to desire the happiness and relationship she once had before she became a mother and somewhat envies Wanda's stable life, but is still content with her family. She always talks in a calm voice, even when discussing an insane thing that her family is doing, as if it were normal.
 Carl Bitterman (Joel Murray) is Melinda's husky, big-muscled and overweight husband. A seemingly bum like man, Carl claims that he gives his kids strict discipline, even though he has lowered himself to their level many times, particularly Rodney, who pesters Carl until he takes aggressive action. Carl is usually envied by Darryl, for his mechanic skills and other things Darryl fails at. Carl can be rude and obnoxious at times, but considers himself the "man of the house". He usually involves his children in several activities, such as practicing to shoot arrows or riding in a hover car without seat belts. He belittles Darryl's parenting skills, and self-confidence, either bluntly or through his children who have little respect for Darryl. Because of this, Carl and Darryl do not particularly get along, although Darryl has been talked into doing things he would not normally do, because of Carl's forceful insistence.
 Rodney Bitterman (Kath Soucie) is the eight-year-old son of Carl and Melinda Bitterman. Rodney is also the antagonist. Rodney is very mischievous and is best known for causing a lot of trouble. However, he's the smartest of his siblings and is street wise. Rodney repeatedly pesters his dad by asking stupid questions, shooting knock-knock jokes to avoid going to bed, and placing his finger an inch from his father's tools immediately after being told not to touch them. Rodney's antics always makes his sister, Megan, laugh.  Besides being a menace, he can be very sympathetic, particularly to Darryl and Zoe. The sensitive side of Rodney has shown his somewhat neglected or misunderstood relationship with his dad. At one time, Rodney had tried one of Darryl's cheesy mushrooms and realized how much he cared about good food and wanted to cook. However, his father thought it was silly, so Rodney had relied on Darryl to help him.  This preference to Darryl over his own dad led Darryl to pride, despite Rodney's annoying and teasing Darryl many times previously. Rodney's sensitive side also shows through his a caring and loving relationship with Zoe.
 Megan Bitterman (Kath Soucie) is Rodney's younger sister and is very close to Rodney. Megan is most commonly known for laughing out loud at anything Rodney does to pester their father. Megan is almost always seen with Rodney and keeps a huge smile on her face all the time. However, when Rodney is not around, she is seen to get very sad and cry.
 Shelby Bitterman is Carl and Melinda's youngest son who is a sociopath and is always seen carrying a fat, green, baseball bat around which he hits things with, without expression. The episode "Hurtin Inside" revealed he is four years old. He never speaks, but often communicates by pointing, and was once seen to whisper to his mom at a game of baseball in "The Bitterman Hillbillies".
 Bizzy Carey (Nicole Sullivan) is Darryl and Wanda's teenage friend who babysits Zoe on many occasions. The MacPhersons have known her since she was a girl scout. Bizzy seems to look older than she actually is, since Darryl's boss once bought Darryl's lie about her being his wife.  She dislikes Drew Carey, her faux morally responsible stepfather. Wanda and Darryl many times have had to question her about her many dysfunctional boyfriends.  Bizzy is blond, very thin and has a fast metabolism, as she once claimed when Wanda discovered Bizzy had been sitting on the couch all day, eating a whole bag of chocolate chip cookies, with no worry, while babysitting. It is unknown if Bizzy is her real name or not.
 Kenny (Diedrich Bader) is Darryl's smooth-talking friend and co-worker at the office.  Kenny is something of a nuisance to Darryl, such as bragging about his life and family, or poking fun at Darryl's personal relationship with Wanda. Darryl normally talks to Kenny about his problems at home, to which Kenny advises with either agreeable or nonagreeable mischievous ideas. Kenny's personality is seen to be laid back and worry-free, however, he grew upset and anxious one time Darryl stopped working for a while.  Even though Kenny seems to think his family's normal, it's hinted that his wife was cheating on him with a neighbor, and that he might be a neglectful father, since for one second in an episode he forgot he had a third child.
 Charlie (Phil LaMarr) is the MacPhersons' pet dog.

Recurring and minor 
 Rex (Phil LaMarr) and Josie (Wendy Raquel Robinson) are an African-American couple who are close friends of Darryl and Wanda's. Rex is known for appearing in sweaters similar to what Bill Cosby wore on The Cosby Show, while Josie's favorite pastime is gardening. In the episode "God Forbid", they admit that they are Moonies.
 Sylvia (Kath Soucie) and Midge (E. G. Daily) are a lesbian couple who are close friends of Darryl and Wanda's. Sylvia has black hair, while Midge is blonde.
 Mrs. Johnson (Alice Hirson) is an elderly lady, and another one of Darryl and Wanda's neighbors. She has an unseen son named Howard, a "man-child" who still loves to read comics in his treehouse.
 Officer Murphy (Diedrich Bader) is an obese police officer who speaks with a stereotypical Irish accent.
 Dr. Gruber (Steven Weber) is the MacPhersons' big-nosed, big-eared family doctor who likes to make jokes. He appeared in two episodes straight, "Ugly Zoe" and "Wanda Proof".
 Hugh (Jim Cummings) and Maggie Wizowski (Elizabeth Perkins) are Wanda's parents who appeared in two episodes, "Rodney Moves In" and "A Baby Blues Christmas Special", along with Darryl's parents. Darryl criticized his father-in-law for telling lousy stories.
 Pauline (Arabella Field) and "Mac" MacPherson are Darryl's mother and silent father.
 Bunny (Kath Soucie) is a close friend of Wanda's, and the only character from the comic strip, besides the MacPherson/Wizowski family, to appear in this series. However, unlike in the strip, where she has a son named Bogart, she has a baby boy with long blond hair named Haget. Butch, her husband from the original comic strip, never appears in the series.

Production
Warner Bros. Animation produced eight of the season one episodes, with overseas animation done by Varga Studio in Hungary for five of them (including the pilot), and Sunwoo Entertainment in Korea for the three others. Rough Draft Studios in Los Angeles did five episodes, which include "Bizzy Moves In", "Rodney Has Two Daddies", "Hurtin' Inside", "Ugly Zoe", and "Wanda Moves Up".

In another attempt to compete with Fox's popular animated sitcoms, The WB made the series to be more adult-oriented than the comic strip (by having some sexuality, mild swearing, etc.). Because Rick Kirkman and Jerry Scott had limited creative control over the animated version, they were not completely pleased about this kind of difference, though Scott said he liked "part of it".

The Baby Blues animated series took nearly five years to develop and produce, and what was initially the pilot, "A Baby Blues Christmas Special", was supposed to air in December 1998, but it was postponed more than once, while other episodes were being ordered and completed. The Christmas episode finally aired on Adult Swim on February 24, 2002. In 1999, the series was almost to be re-titled Bluesville without Scott's knowledge, but Baby Blues was kept as the title, given how popular the comic strip is with more than 60 million readers.

Opening sequence
The opening theme song was a shorter version of "It's All Been Done" by Barenaked Ladies, from their 1998 album Stunt. The title sequence was designed by Renegade Animation, who would later be known for Cartoon Network's Hi Hi Puffy AmiYumi, and shows the characters at the Warner Bros. studios.

Episodes

Series overview

Season 1 (2000–02)

Unaired second season
In September 2000, Warner Bros. announced that a second season would be produced. Although a second season, consisting of 13 episodes, was produced, it has never aired. Kirkman stated that the second season was nearly complete, and only needed a few final edits (such as replacing the temp music), before it was ready for release. Despite this, however, Kirkman also states that the season was written off as a loss by The WB as an accounting practice,  and "will probably never see the light of day".

Broadcast
The WB typically aired two episodes each week, thus enabling eight different episodes to be shown in the five-week run, but abandoned plans to air additional episodes which had been completed. Previously unaired episodes from the first season later aired on Cartoon Network's late night programming block, Adult Swim, and later on sister channel TBS, and on Teletoon at Night in Canada.

Reception
When Baby Blues aired on The WB, it got moderate to low ratings, resulting in its cancellation in August 2000. The series also received mixed to negative reviews from professional critics. Particularly, on its premiere night, South Coast Today wrote that "'Baby Blues' is hardly perfect. Its teen characters are right out of the MTV/WB playbook; the notion of a nutty family next door is as old as the sitcom hills. But as a slightly silly, slightly sweet summer series that's not afraid to show it has a heart, it more than exceeds even this cranky critic's expectations." David Bianculli of New York Daily News was negative towards Baby Blues, giving it 1 1/2 stars, and called it "depressingly flat". Also in the article, he wrote "Timing and originality, even in comedy, may not be everything – but they count for a lot, and WB's new 'Baby Blues' series doesn't get high marks in either category. First, 'Baby Blues', which premieres with a double header tonight at 8, is an animated prime-time comedy, arriving the summer after a season in which there were too many dull entries in that particular genre. That's bad timing. 'Baby Blues' could overcome that by being funnier than the rest. Unfortunately, it's not. Second, 'Baby Blues', based on the syndicated comic strip by Rick Kirkman and Jerry Scott, is a sitcom in two dimensions. That is, it's an animated show in which human beings engage in everyday activities – working, goofing off, sleeping, fighting and so on. At its best, this particular category of animated comedy gives you 'The Simpsons'. At its worst, it gives you 'Clerks'."

John Kiesewetter from the Television Critics Association wrote a negative article on the series. He calls it "an embarrassment to the newspaper comic's loyal readers, all 60 million", and criticizes The WB for turning "the sweet family musings into a cross between Dennis the Menace and Dawson's Creek", and for having it lack "the charm, wit and insights of the daily strip about weary new parents Darryl and Wanda MacPherson, and baby Zoe."

Notes

References

External links

 

2000 American television series debuts
2002 American television series endings
2000s American adult animated television series
2000s American sitcoms
2000s American surreal comedy television series
American adult animated comedy television series
American animated sitcoms
English-language television shows
The WB original programming
Television shows based on comic strips
Television series by Rough Draft Studios
Television series by Warner Bros. Television Studios
Television series by Warner Bros. Animation
Animated television series about families